Cryptospira elegans , the elegant marginella, is a sea snail species in the genus Cryptospira. it is found in Asia.

References

External links
 

 
 

Marginellidae
Gastropods described in 1791